Phiaris bipunctana is a moth of the family Tortricidae. It is found in most of Europe (except Iceland, Ireland, Great Britain, the Iberian Peninsula, Hungary, most of the Balkan Peninsula and Ukraine), east to the eastern part of the Palearctic realm. It was recently discovered in Canada (Manitoba).

The wingspan is 17–20 mm. Adults are on wing from April to August in one generation.

The larvae feed on Vaccinium myrtillus, Vaccinium vitis-idaea, Rhododendron and Pyrola. They spin the leaves of their host together and feed inside.

References

External links
 microlepidoptera.nl
 Fauna Europaea

Olethreutinae
Moths described in 1794
Moths of Europe
Moths of North America
Taxa named by Johan Christian Fabricius